An  is a Japanese woodblock print that mimics a stone rubbing.  It has uninked images or text on a dark, usually black, background.

Gallery

References
 Lane, Richard, Images from the Floating World, The Japanese Print, New York, Dorset Press, 1978, p. 279 
 Newland, Amy Reigle, Hotei Encyclopedia of Japanese Woodblock Prints, Amsterdam, Hotei, 2005, p. 447, 

Ukiyo-e genres